Ákos Lippai (born 13 June 1979 in Miskolc) is a Hungarian football player who currently plays for Diósgyőri VTK.

References
HLSZ 

1979 births
Living people
Sportspeople from Miskolc
Hungarian footballers
Association football midfielders
Hungary youth international footballers
Diósgyőri VTK players
FC Sopron players
Kecskeméti TE players
Egri FC players
Bőcs KSC footballers
Hapoel Tzafririm Holon F.C. players
Nyíregyháza Spartacus FC players
Hungarian expatriate footballers
Expatriate footballers in Israel
Hungarian expatriate sportspeople in Israel